William Lewis (born October 31, 1827 in Scotland; died December 11, 1891 in Hamden, New York) was an American merchant and politician from New York.

Life
The family emigrated to the United States in 1834, and settled on a farm in Delaware County, New York. He attended the common schools, and then became a merchant in Hamden at the age of 23. He married Janette Neish. Later he was also a contractor, and built about 20 miles of the New York and Oswego Midland Railroad in 1870 and 1871.

He was a Republican member of the New York State Assembly (Delaware Co., 1st D.) in 1872 and 1873; Supervisor of the Town of Hamden from 1875 to 1883; Chairman of the Board of Supervisors of Delaware County in 1877 and 1878; again a member of the State Assembly (Delaware Co.) in 1881; and a member of the New York State Senate (24th D.) in 1888 and 1889.

Lewis died in his home in Hamden at the age of 64.

References

Sources
 The New York Red Book compiled by Edgar L. Murlin (published by James B. Lyon, Albany NY, 1897; pg. 403, 493f and 500)
 Life Sketches of Executive Officers and Members of the Legislature of the State of New York by William H. McElroy & Alexander McBride (1873; pg. 245f)
 Biographical sketches of the members of the Legislature in The Evening Journal Almanac (1888)
 The History of Delaware County ("The Town of Hamden")

1827 births
Republican Party New York (state) state senators
Republican Party members of the New York State Assembly
People from Delaware County, New York
1891 deaths
19th-century American politicians